The following people have the surname Sievwright, or Sievewright:

Charles Sievwright (1800–1855 ) British army officer and Assistant Protector of Aborigines in New South Wales.
George Sievwright (born 1937), Scottish footballer
James Sievewright (1783–1852) minister and Free Church moderator
John Sievewright (born 1846), Canadian politician and teacher
Margaret Sievwright (1844–1905), New Zealand political activist
Nikki Sievwright (1943–2018), model
Robert Sievwright (1882–1947), Scottish cricketer